Nides can refer to:

Thomas Nides, U.S. official

NIDES stands for:

Network Intrusion detection system